The Tribuna of the Uffizi is an octagonal room in the Uffizi gallery, Florence, Italy.  Designed by Bernardo Buontalenti for Francesco I de' Medici in 1584, the most important antiquities and High Renaissance and Bolognese paintings from the Medici collection were and still are displayed here.
The structure is octagonal because, according to Christian tradition, eight is the number which draws near Heaven. 

In 1737 the Grand Duchess Anna Maria Luisa de' Medici ceded the collection to the Tuscan government, and by the 1770s the Uffizi (and in particular the Tribuna) was the hub for Grand Tourists visiting Florence.

Painting 

Johann Zoffany's famous painting of the Tribuna, commissioned by Queen Charlotte of the United Kingdom in 1772, portrays the northeast section but varies the arrangement and brings in works not normally displayed in the room, such as Raphael’s Madonna della Sedia.  Admiring the works of art are connoisseurs, diplomats and visitors to Florence, all identifiable.
The Tribuna degli Uffizi was restored between 2009 and 2012.

References

External links
 

Buildings and structures completed in 1584
1580s establishments in Italy
Individual rooms
Octagonal buildings in Italy
Uffizi